Bako Samaba is a village in the Kara Region of northern Togo. 
Nearby towns and villages include Koukouo Tougou (3.1 nm), Kouadangou (1.4 nm), Koutatiegou (2.0 nm), Koutagou (2.2 nm), Koudan-Mangou (1.0 nm), Kouatie (2.8 nm) and Dissani (4.1 nm.

References

External links
Satellite map at Maplandia.com

Populated places in Kara Region